Ethmia yeni is a moth in the family Depressariidae. It was described by Andras Kun in 2001. It is found in Hainan, China. The name is in honour of Taiwanese lepidopterist Shen-Horn Yen, who collects the species.

References

Moths described in 2001
yeni